Talmara (also Romanized as Tālmarā) is a village in Ashkara Rural District, Fareghan District, Hajjiabad County, Hormozgan Province, Iran. At the 2006 census, its population was 47, in 14 families.

References 

Populated places in Hajjiabad County